Kinnersley Castle in Herefordshire, England, is one of the many marches castles along the Welsh Borders.

The Elizabethan building that now occupies the site has obliterated all but a few traces of the medieval castle.

Although it looks predominantly Elizabethan on the outside, it has many features of different periods. It was 'renovated' in the 16th century by the Vaughn family and houses a fine example of an intricate plasterwork ceiling in the solar, thought to be one of the oldest in Herefordshire. There are many green men and serpent hounds to be found on this ceiling, a lot of the detail is picked out in gold. On the stone overmantel of the fireplace, carved into the stone is a boy's head with a serpent around its neck.

References

External links
Castle website

Castles in Herefordshire
Grade II* listed buildings in Herefordshire
Elizabethan architecture